Leptosteges flavicostella is a moth in the family Crambidae. It was described by Charles H. Fernald in 1887. It is found in North America, where it has been recorded from Florida, South Carolina and Georgia.

The wingspan is 11–13 mm. Adults are on wing from April to November in Florida.

References

Moths described in 1887
Schoenobiinae